Paraboea are a genus of flowering plants in the African violet family Gesneriaceae, native to southern China (including Taiwan and Hainan), Assam, Indochina, and Malesia. They were recircumscribed from Boea in 2016.

Species
Currently accepted species include:

Paraboea acaulis (Barnett) C.Puglisi
Paraboea acuta (C.B.Clarke) C.Puglisi
Paraboea acutifolia (Ridl.) B.L.Burtt
Paraboea albida (Barnett) C.Puglisi
Paraboea amplexicaulis (C.S.P.Parish ex C.B.Clarke) C.Puglisi
Paraboea amplifolia Z.R.Xu & B.L.Burtt
Paraboea angustifolia Yan Liu & W.B.Xu
Paraboea apiensis Z.R.Xu
Paraboea arachnoidea Triboun
Paraboea argentea Z.R.Xu
Paraboea axillaris Triboun
Paraboea bakeri M.R.Hend.
Paraboea banyengiana B.L.Burtt
Paraboea barnettiae C.Puglisi
Paraboea berouwensis Z.R.Xu & B.L.Burtt
Paraboea bhumiboliana Triboun & Chuchan
Paraboea bintangensis B.L.Burtt
Paraboea birmanica (Craib) C.Puglisi
Paraboea brachycarpa (Ridl.) B.L.Burtt
Paraboea brunnescens B.L.Burtt
Paraboea burttii Z.R.Xu
Paraboea caerulescens (Ridl.) B.L.Burtt
Paraboea candidissima B.L.Burtt
Paraboea capitata Ridl.
Paraboea changjiangensis F.W.Xing & Z.X.Li
Paraboea chiangdaoensis Z.R.Xu & B.L.Burtt
Paraboea chumphonensis Triboun
Paraboea clarkei B.L.Burtt
Paraboea cochinchinensis (C.B.Clarke) B.L.Burtt
Paraboea connata (Craib) C.Y.Wu
Paraboea crassifila W.B.Xu & J.Guo
Paraboea crassifolia (Hemsl.) B.L.Burtt
Paraboea detergibilis (C.B.Clarke) B.L.Burtt
Paraboea dictyoneura (Hance) B.L.Burtt
Paraboea divaricata (Ridl.) B.L.Burtt
Paraboea doitungensis Triboun & D.J.Middleton
Paraboea dushanensis W.B.Xu & M.Q.Han
Paraboea eburnea Triboun
Paraboea effusa B.L.Burtt
Paraboea elegans (Ridl.) B.L.Burtt
Paraboea ferruginea (Ridl.) Ridl.
Paraboea filipes (Hance) B.L.Burtt
Paraboea fimbriata C.Puglisi & Phutthai
Paraboea glabra (Ridl.) B.L.Burtt
Paraboea glabrescens (Barnett) C.Puglisi
Paraboea glabriflora (Barnett) B.L.Burtt
Paraboea glabrisepala B.L.Burtt
Paraboea glandulifera (Barnett) C.Puglisi
Paraboea glanduliflora Barnett
Paraboea glandulosa (B.L.Burtt) C.Puglisi
Paraboea glutinosa (Hand.-Mazz.) K.Y.Pan
Paraboea gracillima Kiew
Paraboea graniticola Z.R.Xu
Paraboea guilinensis L.Xu & Y.G.Wei
Paraboea hainanensis (Chun) B.L.Burtt
Paraboea halongensis Kiew & T.H.Nguyên
Paraboea harroviana (Craib) Z.R.Xu
Paraboea havilandii (Ridl.) B.L.Burtt
Paraboea hekouensis Y.M.Shui & W.H.Chen
Paraboea incudicarpa B.L.Burtt
Paraboea insularis Triboun
Paraboea kalimantanensis Z.R.Xu & B.L.Burtt
Paraboea lambokensis Kiew
Paraboea lanata (Ridl.) B.L.Burtt
Paraboea lancifolia (Ridl.) B.L.Burtt
Paraboea lavandulodora Triboun
Paraboea laxa (Ridl.) Ridl.
Paraboea leopoldii K.M.Wong, J.T.Pereira, Sugau & S.P.Lim
Paraboea leporina (H.J.Lam) B.L.Burtt
Paraboea leuserensis B.L.Burtt
Paraboea longipetiolata (B.L.Burtt) C.Puglisi
Paraboea luzoniensis Merr.
Paraboea maculata C.Puglisi
Paraboea mahaxayana Z.R.Xu & B.L.Burtt
Paraboea manhaoensis Y.M.Shui & W.H.Chen
Paraboea martini (H.Lév. & Vaniot) B.L.Burtt
Paraboea mataensis Z.R.Xu & B.L.Burtt
Paraboea meiophylla B.L.Burtt
Paraboea middletonii Triboun
Paraboea minahassae (Teijsm. & Binn.) B.L.Burtt
Paraboea minor (Barnett) B.L.Burtt
Paraboea minuta (Kraenzl.) B.L.Burtt
Paraboea minutiflora D.J.Middleton
Paraboea nagalandiana Deb & Ratna Dutta
Paraboea nana Triboun & Dongkumfu
Paraboea nervosissima Z.R.Xu & B.L.Burtt
Paraboea neurophylla (Collett & Hemsl.) B.L.Burtt
Paraboea nobilis Triboun & D.J.Middleton
Paraboea nutans D.Fang & D.H.Qin
Paraboea obtusa (C.B.Clarke) C.Puglisi
Paraboea paniculata (Ridl.) B.L.Burtt
Paraboea paramartinii Z.R.Xu & B.L.Burtt
Paraboea paraprimuloides Z.R.Xu
Paraboea parviflora (Ridl.) B.L.Burtt
Paraboea patens (Ridl.) B.L.Burtt
Paraboea peltifolia D.Fang & L.Zeng
Paraboea peninsularis Triboun & D.J.Middleton
Paraboea phanomensis Triboun & D.J.Middleton
Paraboea prazeri (B.L.Burtt) C.Puglisi
Paraboea prolixa (C.B.Clarke) B.L.Burtt
Paraboea pubicorolla Z.R.Xu & B.L.Burtt
Paraboea puglisiae Triboun & D.J.Middleton
Paraboea punggulensis Kiew
Paraboea quercifolia Triboun
Paraboea rabilii Z.R.Xu & B.L.Burtt
Paraboea robusta (B.L.Burtt) C.Puglisi
Paraboea romklaoensis D.J.Middleton & Triboun
Paraboea rosea Triboun
Paraboea rufescens (Franch.) B.L.Burtt
Paraboea sabahensis Z.R.Xu & B.L.Burtt
Paraboea sangwaniae Triboun
Paraboea scabriflora B.L.Burtt
Paraboea schefferi (H.O.Forbes) B.L.Burtt
Paraboea siamensis Triboun
Paraboea sinensis (Oliv.) B.L.Burtt
Paraboea sinovietnamica W.B.Xu & J.Guo
Paraboea speciosa (Rech.) B.L.Burtt
Paraboea speluncarum (B.L.Burtt) B.L.Burtt
Paraboea stellata D.J.Middleton
Paraboea strobilacea (Barnett) C.Puglisi
Paraboea subplana (B.L.Burtt) C.Puglisi
Paraboea suffruticosa (Ridl.) B.L.Burtt
Paraboea swinhoei (Hance) B.L.Burtt
Paraboea takensis Triboun
Paraboea tarutaoensis Z.R.Xu & B.L.Burtt
Paraboea tenuicalyx Triboun
Paraboea tetrabracteata F.Wen, Xin Hong & Y.G.Wei
Paraboea thorelii (Pellegr.) B.L.Burtt
Paraboea trachyphylla Z.R.Xu & B.L.Burtt
Paraboea treubii (H.O.Forbes) B.L.Burtt
Paraboea trisepala W.H.Chen & Y.M.Shui
Paraboea umbellata (Drake) B.L.Burtt
Paraboea uniflora Z.R.Xu & B.L.Burtt
Paraboea vachareea Triboun & Sonsupab
Paraboea variopila Z.R.Xu & B.L.Burtt
Paraboea velutina (W.T.Wang & C.Z.Gao) B.L.Burtt
Paraboea verticillata (Ridl.) B.L.Burtt
Paraboea vulpina Ridl.
Paraboea wenshanensis Xin Hong & F.Wen
Paraboea xiangguiensis W.B.Xu & B.Pan
Paraboea xylocaulis Triboun
Paraboea yunfuensis F.Wen & Y.G.Wei

References

Didymocarpoideae
Gesneriaceae genera